Thomas Schäfer (born 1970 in Marburg) is a German mechanical engineer, manager, and from 1 July 2022 the CEO of Volkswagen Passenger Cars.

Education 
In 1991 he began a dual study programme at Daimler AG. It was provided by the Baden-Württemberg Cooperative State University, where he graduated as a mechanical engineer (production technology specialization) in 1994.

Career 
During 1991-2001 he worked at Daimler AG in various roles managing the production and quality in Germany, United States, South Africa, Malaysia and China. In 2012 he became the Head of Group's International Production at Volkswagen AG. Since 2015 he worked as a Chairman and Managing Director of the Volkswagen Group South Africa. In August 2020 he became the Chairman of the Board at Skoda Auto in the Czech Republic.

References

External links 
10-minute interview for the Brenthurst Foundation
Interview about electric cars in Africa
Interview about Volkswagen plans in India

Living people
1970 births
Volkswagen Group executives
Mercedes-Benz Group executives
Baden-Württemberg Cooperative State University alumni